Martin Urra (8 February 1931 - 11 September 2002) was a Filipino basketball player who competed in the 1956 Summer Olympics.

He died in Pasay, Philippines.

References

External links
 

1931 births
2002 deaths
Olympic basketball players of the Philippines
De La Salle Green Archers basketball players
Basketball players at the 1956 Summer Olympics
Asian Games medalists in basketball
Basketball players at the 1958 Asian Games
Philippines men's national basketball team players
Filipino men's basketball players
Asian Games gold medalists for the Philippines
Medalists at the 1958 Asian Games
Place of birth missing